Human mail is the transportation of a person through the postal system, usually as a stowaway.  While rare, there have been some reported cases of people attempting to travel through the mail.

More common, at least in popular fiction, is the mailing of a part of a person, often a kidnap victim.

Real occurrences
Henry Brown (age 42), an African-American slave from Virginia, successfully escaped in a shipping box sent north to the free state of Pennsylvania in 1849. He was known thereafter as Henry "Box" Brown.
W. Reginald Bray mailed himself within England by ordinary mail in 1900 and then by registered mail in 1903.
Suffragettes Elspeth Douglas McClelland and Daisy Solomon mailed themselves successfully to the then Prime Minister of the United Kingdom, H. H. Asquith at 10 Downing Street on 23 February 1909 but his office refused to accept the letters.
Reg Spiers mailed himself from Heathrow Airport, London, to Perth Airport, Western Australia, in 1964. His 63-hour journey was spent in a box made by fellow British javelin thrower John McSorley. Spiers spent some time outside his container in the cargo hold of the plane, and suffered from dehydration when he was offloaded onto the tarmac of Bombay Airport. He arrived in Perth undetected and returned home to Adelaide.
In 1965 Brian Robson posted himself from Australia to the UK; he was discovered in the US in transit and sent back to the UK.  The journey took four days with the box repeatedly being stored upside down. Two men, Paul and John, assisted him in the trip by nailing the box shut. 
Charles McKinley (age 25) shipped himself from New York City to Dallas, Texas in a box in 2003. He was attempting to visit his parents and wanted to save on the air fare by charging the shipping fees to his former employer. However, he was discovered during the final leg of his journey having successfully travelled by plane.
 An inmate (age 42) serving a seven-year drug conviction sentence in Germany escaped from a prison by climbing into a box in the mail room which was picked up by a courier in 2008.
In August 2012, a man in Chongqing, a city in southern China, decided to ship himself to his girlfriend as a prank. Unfortunately, his prank almost turned deadly when the courier took three hours to deliver the package. Seng had minimal air in the box which was too thick to puncture a hole so that he could breathe. When he arrived at the destination address, his girlfriend found him unconscious and he had to be revived by paramedics.

Mailing children

The children were carried along by mail carriers, but were not put in boxes.

In popular culture
Flat Stanley, a 1964 children's book by Jeff Brown, sees the eponymous main character squashed flat in an accident and subsequently sent via air mail.
The plot of one episode of Beavis and Butt-Head includes the pair trying to mail themselves.
The music video for MC 900 Ft. Jesus' song "If I Only Had a Brain" involves the artist attempting to mail himself, only to end up back where he started.
The Velvet Underground song "The Gift" from the album White Light/White Heat has a grisly take on the perils of human mail.
A 1993 work by the cartoonist Cripppen (Dave Lupton) in the context of the Disabled People's Direct Action Network's protest campaign for accessibility of UK public transport.
 In the movie George of the Jungle, George ships himself via UPS back to the jungle from San Francisco.
 In the TV series Malcolm in The Middle, Reese attempts to ship himself to China, but is instead sent on a bogus journey by his brother, Dewey, without leaving the garage.
 In the TV series Firefly, in the episode "The Message", a former compatriot of Mal and Zoe mails himself to them so they would protect him from people to whom he owed money.
 In the TV series Garfield and Friends, Garfield often attempts to mail his nuisance Nermal to Abu Dhabi, as in the segment "First Class Feline" of Episode 36.
 In the Trailer Park Boys episode "Working Man", Cory and Trevor are mailed, along with a large quantity of marijuana to a Snoop Dogg show.
 In the movie Hudson Hawk, Bruce Willis' character is rendered unconscious, and wakes up in a packing material-filled shipping crate in another country.
 In the American Dad! episode "Of Ice and Men", Steve and his friends accidentally receive Svetlana, a mail order Russian bride, instead of the binoculars they ordered.
 In the TV series The Drew Carey Show, Drew's nemesis Mimi ships him to China where he wakes up on the Great Wall.
 In the TV series WonderWorks, the episode "Konrad" features a factory-made boy shipped in a package, then delivered to his new parents.
 In the 1970 Disney animated movie The Aristocats, the villain (butler Edgar Balthazar) attempts to mail his employer's cats to Timbuktu. Edgar ends up being shipped instead.
 In The Simpsons episode "Bart on the Road", Bart Simpson's friends return to Springfield stowed away inside a crate, with Bart as the courier.
 In The Simpsons episode "In the Name of the Grandfather", Moe ships himself to Ireland to meet Homer and Abe.
 In the comic series Knights of the Dinner Table, Brian mails Bob to the warehouse at Hard 8 in the incorrect belief that doing so will gain him covert access to the warehouse without breaking any law.
 In SciFi novel Mirror Dance by Lois McMaster Bujold,  Miles Vorkosigan gets shot by needle grenade. He is frozen in a cryonic chamber on the spot, but the medic in charge becomes separated from the rest of the team and uses an automated shipping system to send the chamber to safety, but is killed before he can tell anyone what he did and where he sent it.

See also
Freighthopping

References

 
 Henry Box Brown, b. 1816 Narrative of the Life of Henry Box Brown, Written by Himself – full text of the Narrative.  Accessed 30 March 2010.
 (10 September 2003) "Federal charge filed against man who shipped himself in crate" at the U.S. Department of Justice.  Accessed 3 January 2006.
 Adams, Cecil (30 December 2005) "Special Delivery: Can a live person be packed in a shipping crate and mailed?" at Straight Dope.  Accessed 3 January 2006.
  Inmate escapes German jail in box at BBC News.  Accessed 5 January 2009.

External links
Narrative of Henry Box Brown...Written from a Statement of Facts Made by Himself. With Remarks Upon the Remedy for Slavery by Charles Stearns. from North American Slave Narratives
website with stowaway movies

Postal systems